20 Years of Hell is a series of EPs released by Anti-Flag. In honor of the band's 20th anniversary, they released the EPs via a subscription service. Each EP, which was released digitally and as a 7", is a split, featuring two songs by Anti-Flag, both of which are re-recordings of previous Anti-Flag songs, with the exception of the last EP which features one re-recording and one new song, and two songs by a new band.

Vol. I
The first volume was released on July 21, 2013.
Track listing

Vol. II
The second volume was released on October 3, 2013.
Track listing

Vol. III
The third volume was released on July 21, 2013.
Track listing

Vol. IV
The fourth volume was released on February 18, 2014.
Track listing

Vol. V
The fifth volume was released on June 4, 2014.
Track listing

Vol. VI
The sixth and final volume was released in July 2014
Track listing

References

Anti-Flag albums
2013 EPs
2014 EPs
EP series
A-F Records albums